Airforce Delta Strike, known as  in Japan and Deadly Skies III in Europe, is the third installment in the Konami Airforce Delta series. It was released in 2004 exclusively on the PlayStation 2. It plays very similarly to the previous Airforce Delta games.

Story

The game plot occurs in an unspecified time in the future, featuring sci-fi weapons, planes and environments. When OCC (Orbital Citizen Community), a space colony set on Earth's orbit, rebels and launches an invasion of Earth, EDAF (Earth Defense Allied Forces) launches a defensive campaign. EDAF is overwhelmed by the OCC's superior weapons and numbers early in the war, losing a majority of its conventional forces and is forced to enlist any militia forces to help, including the Delta Squadron, an ill-famed aerial strike group known as a "dumping ground" for disgraced or misfit pilots. Despite their differences, Delta Squadron's efforts allow the EDAF to turn the tide and liberate portions of Earth occupied by the OCC, earning them the attention and rivalry of the OCC's elite experimental squadron. As the tide starts to turn and as the Earth forces advance, they find out that OCC is not the major threat - an organization from Mars is planning to destroy Earth with the help of the orbital colony.

Gameplay

AFDS features a large selection of planes to choose from and a series of missions to play through. However, unlike the previous installments, AFDS features an all new cast of anime-style characters illustrated by Jun Tsukasa. Some can be played as and others are just for support. Each character has a unique selection of planes to fly and has a different branch of missions to complete. Completion of some missions unlocks secret missions and hidden planes for replays.

After the game is once completed, a secret hangar becomes available. As the game is completed and medals are earned, more secret planes become available.

Reception

The game received "average" reviews according to the review aggregation website Metacritic. In Japan, Famitsu gave it a score of one seven, two eights, and one six for a total of 29 out of 40.

References

External links
 

2004 video games
Combat flight simulators
Konami games
PlayStation 2 games
PlayStation 2-only games
Space combat simulators
Video games set in the future
Crossover video games
Airforce Delta
Video games developed in Japan